Taras Dutko (born 27 January 1982) is a Ukrainian Paralympic footballer with cerebral palsy, who won a gold medal at the 2008 Summer Paralympics in Beijing, China. He started playing football in 2000 and since then participated at the 2004, 2008 and 2016 Summer Paralympics.

References

External links
 

1982 births
Living people
Paralympic 7-a-side football players of Ukraine
Paralympic gold medalists for Ukraine
Paralympic silver medalists for Ukraine
Paralympic medalists in football 7-a-side
Medalists at the 2000 Summer Paralympics
Medalists at the 2004 Summer Paralympics
Medalists at the 2008 Summer Paralympics
Medalists at the 2012 Summer Paralympics
Medalists at the 2016 Summer Paralympics
7-a-side footballers at the 2000 Summer Paralympics
7-a-side footballers at the 2004 Summer Paralympics
7-a-side footballers at the 2008 Summer Paralympics
7-a-side footballers at the 2012 Summer Paralympics
7-a-side footballers at the 2016 Summer Paralympics